The Indianapolis Capitals were an American Hockey League professional ice hockey team based in Indianapolis, Indiana, from 1939 to 1952. The Capitals were a farm team for the Detroit Red Wings. Indianapolis won the Calder Cup in 1942 and 1950. They played in the Indiana State Fairgrounds Coliseum.

There was also a Central Hockey League team with a similar name, the Indianapolis Capitals, that in 1963 played in the same arena. They played nine games before being relocated to Cincinnati to play as the Cincinnati Wings due to an explosion that rendered the Coliseum unusable. The team was again relocated this time to Memphis, Tennessee, for the 1964–65 season, where they were renamed the Memphis Wings. Their last season was the 1966–67 season.

Season-by-season results
 Indianapolis Capitals 1939–1940 (International-American Hockey League)
 Indianapolis Capitals 1940–1952 (American Hockey League)

Regular season

Playoffs

Defunct American Hockey League teams
Capitals
Ice hockey teams in Indiana
Ice hockey clubs established in 1939
Sports clubs disestablished in 1952
Central Professional Hockey League teams
1939 establishments in Indiana
1952 disestablishments in Indiana